Under UNESCO's Man and the Biosphere Programme, there are 31 biosphere reserves recognised as part of the World Network of Biosphere Reserves in the African States and Arab States. These are distributed across 12 countries in the region .

Biosphere reserves
 – Also a World Heritage Site

References

External links
 List of UNESCO World Network of Biosphere Reserves of the Arab States

+